The 2018 Malé League will be the eighth season of the Malé League, the top division of Maldivian football under the latest update of the Maldivian football league system. The league was made up of the 8 clubs.

Format
All eight teams play against each other in Two Round Format. Team with most total points at the end of the season will be crowned as Malé League champion. Top six teams qualify for the Dhivehi Premier League. Bottom two teams play the Malé League qualification with the runner-up of Second Division.

The team with the most points in Malé League qualification after a two-legged group round will play in the next year's Malé League. Bottom two will be relegated to Second Division.

Teams
A total of 8 teams will be contesting in the league.

Teams and their divisions
Note: Table lists clubs in alphabetical order.

Personnel

Note: Flags indicate national team as has been defined under FIFA eligibility rules. Players may hold more than one non-FIFA nationality.

Coaching changes

Foreign players

Players name in bold indicates the player is registered during the mid-season transfer window.

League table

Season summary

Round One and Two

Positions by round
The table lists the positions of teams after each week of matches.

Matches

First round
A total of 28 matches will be played in this round.

Second round
A total of 28 matches will be played in this round.

Season statistics

Top scorers

Hat-tricks

2019 Malé League qualification
The qualifiers were to be played between 2018 Malé League bottom two teams– United Victory and Club Valencia, and 2018 Second Division runner up JJ Sports Club. Due to unknown reasons, JJ Sports Club withdrew their chance in the qualification phase.

United Victory won 4–2 on aggregate and secured their first division spot for next season.
Club Valencia relegated for the first time in the 39-year history of the club.

References
  on Mihaaru Online.

Football leagues in the Maldives
Maldives
1